A salad dressing is a sauce for salads. Used on virtually all leafy salads, dressings may also be used in making salads of beans (such as three bean salad), noodle or pasta salads and antipasti, and forms of potato salad.

Salad dressings can be drizzled over a salad, added and tossed with the ingredients, offered on the side, or served as a dip, as with crudités or chicken wings.

Types
In Western culture, there are two basic types of salad dressing:
 Vinaigrettes based on a mixture (emulsion) of olive or salad oil and vinegar, and variously flavored with herbs, spices, salt, pepper, sugar, and other ingredients such as poppy seeds or ground Parmesan cheese.
 Creamy dressings, usually based on mayonnaise or fermented milk products, such as yogurt, sour cream (crème fraîche, smetana), or buttermilk.

In the United States, buttermilk-based ranch dressing is the most popular, with vinaigrettes and Caesar-style dressing following close behind.

List
Some salad dressings include:

 Balsamic vinaigrette
 Blue cheese
 Boiled
 Caesar
 French
 Ginger
 Green goddess
 Italian
 Louis
 Mayfair
 Honey mustard
 Peanut sauce
 Ranch
 Russian
 Salad cream
 Tahini sauce
 Thousand Island
 Wafu

See also 
 List of salads

References

Condiments